Culham Bridge is a medieval bridge crossing a present backwater of the River Thames in England at Culham, Oxfordshire, near the town of Abingdon. The bridge crosses Swift Ditch which was at one time the main navigation channel of the River Thames until Abingdon Lock was built in 1790. The bridge formerly carried  the A415 road from Abingdon to Dorchester, Oxfordshire, but was superseded in 1928 by a modern road bridge.

It is a Grade II* listed building.

History
Culham Bridge was built of stone between 1416 and 1422 to replace an ancient ford called Culham Hythe by a religious body known as The Brotherhood of Christ (later Christ's Hospital) who subsequently looked after its upkeep. It was built as part of an improvement scheme, together with the two bridges at Abingdon and a causeway across Andersey Island.  It is recorded that the completion of Abingdon Bridge severely damaged trade at Wallingford.

In the early seventeenth century the Oxford-Burcot Commission constructed a lock at the top of Swift Ditch to direct navigation under Culham Bridge and this remained the main route of the Thames until Abingdon Lock was built in 1790.

During the English Civil War the  bridge had considerable strategic importance. After the Royalists left Abingdon in May 1644 the Parliamentarians seized Culham Bridge, and harried the  royalist food convoys on the way to Oxford. The Royalists tried to recapture the bridge and demolish it in January 1645. This resulted in  a skirmish on 11 January known as the battle of Culham Bridge. Sir Henry Gage "while boldly leading his men in a third assault on the enemy... was hit by a bullet and killed".

In the eighteenth century the road was in a very bad state, leading to an Act of Parliament for its improvement. The bridge carried the main traffic until 1928, when the modern road bridge was built upstream of it and Culham Bridge became a pedestrian bridge.

During World War II two concrete pill boxes were built on the bridge, each weighing 250 tons and carrying anti-tank guns, and part of the parapet was removed  to make way for a concrete platform. The bridge was subsequently restored and is classified as an ancient monument.

See also
Crossings of the River Thames
Sutton Bridge, Oxfordshire

References

External links
Tate Gallery - Sketch of the bridge by JMW Turner

Bridges across the River Thames
Bridges in Oxfordshire
Bridges completed in 1422
Stone bridges in England
English Civil War
Grade II* listed buildings in Oxfordshire
Grade II* listed bridges in England
Stone arch bridges